Happy Anniversary, Charlie Brown is an animated TV documentary that celebrates 25 years of the Peanuts comic strip. The special first aired January 9, 1976 on CBS.

Voice actors
 Duncan Watson as Charlie Brown
 Lynn Mortensen as Lucy Van Pelt
 Liam Martin as Linus Van Pelt
 Gail M. Davis as Sally Brown
 Greg Felton as Schroeder
 Stuart Brotman as Peppermint Patty
 James Ahrens as Marcie
 Linda Ercoli as Violet
 Bill Melendez as Snoopy, Woodstock

Credits
 Written and Directed by: Lee Mendelson
 Produced by: Lee Mendelson, Warren Lockhart
 Associate Producer: Paul Preuss
 Director of Photography and Supervising Editor: Chuck Barbee
 Animation by: Bill Melendez Productions Inc.
 Animation Directed by: Bill Melendez, Phil Roman
 Edited by: Paul Preuss, Chuck McCann
 Sound Recordist: John Barbee
 Sound Recording/Mix: Producers' Sound Service - Hollywood
 Camera Assistants: Elizabeth King, Stewart Barbee
 Musical Director: Vince Guaraldi
 Voice Recording: Coast Recorders - San Francisco, California
 Production Staff: Martha Grace, Pat LaFortune
 Rotoscope Artist: Charlotte Richardson
 Re-Recording by: Andy Wiskes
 A Lee Mendelson Production
 in association with Charles Schulz Creative Associates
 © Copyright 1976 by United Feature Syndicate

References

External links
 

1970s animated television specials
Peanuts television documentaries
Television shows directed by Phil Roman
1970s American television specials
1976 television specials
1976 documentary films
1976 films
Documentary films about animation
Documentary specials
1970s American films